Bowling Junction railway station is a closed station in the city of Bradford, West Yorkshire, England. It was situated on the Calder Valley line to the south of Bradford Exchange.

References

Disused railway stations in Bradford
Former Lancashire and Yorkshire Railway stations
Railway stations in Great Britain opened in 1902
Railway stations in Great Britain closed in 1951